The Black Pimpernel is a Swedish drama film directed by Ulf Hultberg and starring Michael Nyqvist and Lisa Werlinder. The film also features Kate Del Castillo, Luis Gnecco and Claire Ross-Brown in a minor part.

The film is about Harald Edelstam, Sweden's ambassador to Chile, who after the military coup of Augusto Pinochet in 1973, managed to save the lives of more than 1,300 people by taking them to his embassy and transporting them to Sweden.

His name comes from the fictional hero The Scarlet Pimpernel, who saved many lives during the French Revolution.

The film was shot in Santiago, including outside the presidential palace La Moneda and at the infamous National Stadium where hundreds of prisoners were tortured and killed. It was shot starting January 2006 and opened September 14, 2007 in Sweden.

References

External links 
 
 
 
 

2007 films
2000s English-language films
2000s Spanish-language films
Anti-Chilean sentiment
Films about the Chilean military dictatorship
Drama films based on actual events
Films set in Chile
Films set in 1973
Films about coups d'état
2007 multilingual films
Swedish multilingual films
2000s Swedish films